Cook Rock is an arched rock,  high, lying close east of Trousers Rock and  northeast of Vindication Island in the South Sandwich Islands. It was charted in 1930 by Discovery Investigations personnel on the Discovery II and named for Captain James Cook.

References 

Rock formations of South Georgia and the South Sandwich Islands